Manjurul Ahsan Munshi is Bangladesh Nationalist Party politician who served as the Jatiya Sangsad member from Comilla-4 constituency in the 5th, 6th, 7th and 8th parliament.

Career
In April 2006, Comilla district court stayed the six-month imprisonment sentence against Munshi in a contempt of court case. In February 2007, Bangladesh Army-led forces detained 14 Bangladesh Nationalist Party politicians, including Munshi, for their alleged links with crime and corruption. In October, a special court sentenced Munshi to 13 years in jail for acquiring wealth illegally and concealing information on his property. He was released in November 2008 on a High Court bail from the Dhaka Central Jail. In January 2009, a magistrate court sentenced another seven and a half years' imprisonment to him for violating code of electoral conduct during the polling on 29 December 2008.

In June 2011, following an appeal by Munshi, the High Court acquitted Munshi of the corruption charges. After hearing the Anti-Corruption Commission's appeal, the Supreme Court, in February 2015, scrapped the verdict of acquittal and directed the High Court to rehear the appeal of Munshi. But in  May 2017, the High Court upheld its verdict acquitting Munshi of charges related to acquiring wealth illegally and concealing information of his property.

Personal life
Munshi is married to Mazeda Ahsan. Together they have two sons, Rizviul Ahsan Munshi and Rizwanul Ahsan Munshi.

References

Living people
Bangladesh Nationalist Party politicians
5th Jatiya Sangsad members
6th Jatiya Sangsad members
7th Jatiya Sangsad members
8th Jatiya Sangsad members
Place of birth missing (living people)
Year of birth missing (living people)
People from Comilla District